The 2009 Oberstaufen Cup was a professional tennis tournament played on outdoor red clay courts. This was the eighteenth edition of the tournament which is part of the 2009 ATP Challenger Tour. It took place in Oberstaufen, Germany between 6 and 12 July 2009.

Singles entrants

Seeds

 Rankings are as of June 29, 2009.

Other entrants
The following players received wildcards into the singles main draw:
  Peter Gojowczyk
  Stefan Koubek
  Nils Langer
  Marcel Zimmermann

The following players received entry from the qualifying draw:
  Dustin Brown
  Jun Woong-Sun
  Cedrik-Marcel Stebe
  Robin Vik

Champions

Singles

 Robin Vik def.  Jan Minář, 6–1, 6–2

Doubles

 Dieter Kindlmann /  Marcel Zimmermann def.  Michael Berrer /  Philipp Oswald, 6–4, 2–6, [10–4]

References
Official website
2009 Draws

Oberstaufen Cup
Clay court tennis tournaments
Oberstaufen Cup
2009 in German tennis